The 2000 European Weightlifting Championships were held in Sofia, Bulgaria. It was the 79th edition of the event.

Medal overview

Men

Women

European Weightlifting Championships
2000 in weightlifting
International weightlifting competitions hosted by Bulgaria
2000 in Bulgarian sport